Stanisława Angel-Engelówna (23 April 1908 – 7 August 1958) was a Polish stage and film actress.

Filmography
 Wrzos (1938)
 Serce matki (1938)
 Rena (1938)
 Florian (1938)
 O czym się nie mówi... (1939)
 Geniusz sceny (1939)

References

External links

1908 births
1958 deaths
Polish film actresses
Actresses from Warsaw
People from Warsaw Governorate
Polish stage actresses
20th-century Polish actresses